The Uruguay Open is a tennis tournament held in Montevideo, Uruguay since 2005. The event is part of the ATP Challenger Tour and is played on outdoor clay courts.

Past finals

Singles

Doubles

See also
 Montevideo Open

References

External links 
Official website
ITF search

 
ATP Challenger Tour
Clay court tennis tournaments
Tennis tournaments in Uruguay
Sport in Montevideo
Spring (season) events in Uruguay
Recurring sporting events established in 2005